National Association for Teaching English and Community Languages to Adults (NATECLA) is a British professional organisation of teachers of ESOL and what are known as "community languages" to adults. 

Through its branch network, workshops, national conferences and publications NATECLA shares information, expertise, comment and good practice with its members, most of whom are involved in the education and training of adults whose first language is not English. Typically members are teachers, tutors, trainers, lecturers, teacher trainers, trainee teachers or researchers, managers or organisers.

NATECLA supports the Ruth Hayman Trust, which gives grants to individuals whose first language is not English who otherwise would not be able to study or train in Britain. The trust was founded in honour of Ruth Hayman, who worked for racial equality and justice.

External links
NATECLA site

English-language education
Educational organisations based in the United Kingdom